In enzymology, a polygalacturonate 4-alpha-galacturonosyltransferase is an enzyme that catalyzes the chemical reaction

UDP-D-galacturonate + (1,4-alpha-D-galacturonosyl)n  UDP + (1,4-alpha-D-galacturonosyl)n+1

Thus, the two substrates of this enzyme are UDP-D-galacturonate and (1,4-alpha-D-galacturonosyl)n, whereas its two products are UDP and (1,4-alpha-D-galacturonosyl)n+1.

This enzyme belongs to the family of glycosyltransferases, specifically the hexosyltransferases.  The systematic name of this enzyme class is UDP-D-galacturonate:1,4-alpha-poly-D-galacturonate 4-alpha-D-galacturonosyltransferase. Other names in common use include UDP galacturonate-polygalacturonate alpha-galacturonosyltransferase, uridine diphosphogalacturonate-polygalacturonate, and alpha-galacturonosyltransferase.  This enzyme participates in starch and sucrose metabolism and nucleotide sugars metabolism.

Indications
Polygalacturonate salts can be used clinically to treat the GI reactions that are due to Quinidine.

References

 

EC 2.4.1
Enzymes of unknown structure